Oliver Saunders (born 23 March 1986) is an Australian–Filipino rugby union footballer for the Philippines national rugby union team where his position is at fly half. Saunders is a former professional rugby league footballer with Norths in the Jersey Flegg Cup.  He is one of the leading try-scores in the Philippines team.
Oliver is brothers with fellow Philippines players Matt Saunders and Benjamin Saunders. In 2011, he and his brother Matt signed to the NTT Communications Shining Arcs for the 2012/2013 season of the Japanese Top League competition.

Personal life
He was born in the United Kingdom with a British father and a Filipina mother from Pangasinan. He has two younger brothers Matt and Benjamin.

References 

1986 births
British emigrants to Australia
Filipino rugby union players
Filipino rugby league players
Living people
Rugby union fly-halves
Australian people of Filipino descent
Rugby articles needing expert attention
Place of birth missing (living people)
Urayasu D-Rocks players
Rugby union players at the 2014 Asian Games
Philippines international rugby union players
Asian Games competitors for the Philippines